Tora Teje (17 January 1893 – 30 April 1970) was a Swedish theatre and silent film actress. She appeared in ten films between 1920 and 1939.

Filmography
 Gubben kommer (1939)
 Getting Married (1926)
 The Lady of the Camellias (1925)
 33.333 (1924)
 Norrtullsligan (1923)
 Häxan (1922)
 Familjens traditioner (1920)
 Erotikon (1920)
 Karin Ingmarsdotter (1920)
 Klostret i Sendomir (1920)

External links

 

1893 births
1970 deaths
Swedish film actresses
Swedish silent film actresses
Actresses from Stockholm
Eugene O'Neill Award winners
Litteris et Artibus recipients
Swedish stage actresses
20th-century Swedish actresses